Marvin Elliott Miller (born  Marvin Mueller; July 18, 1913 – February 8, 1985) was an American actor. Possessing a deep baritone voice, he began his career in radio in St. Louis, Missouri before becoming a Hollywood actor. He is remembered for voicing Robby the Robot in the science fiction film Forbidden Planet (1956), a role he reprised in the lesser-known The Invisible Boy (1957).

Miller's next most notable role is that of Michael Anthony, the loyal assistant of Paul Frees's generous billionaire John Beresford Tipton Jr., on the TV series The Millionaire (1955–1960).

Career

Radio and recordings
Born in St. Louis, Miller graduated from Washington University before commencing his career in radio. When a singer named Marvin Miller debuted on another St. Louis radio station, he began using his middle initial to distinguish himself from the newcomer. For the Mutual Broadcasting System, he narrated a daily 15-minute radio show titled The Story Behind the Story, which offered historical vignettes. He also served as announcer on several Old Time Radio shows of the 1940s and 1950s, including The Jo Stafford Show  and the long-running mystery series The Whistler.

Miller played Dr. Lee Markham on The Woman in White on NBC radio and Howard Andrews on Midstream on the Blue Network and appeared as "The voice of the Past" on the May 21, 1942 broadcast of The Right to Happiness. In 1945–47, he was the announcer for Songs by Sinatra. He played two characters and was the announcer on The Billie Burke Show (1943–1946).

In 1952, Miller had a one-man program, Armchair Adventures, on CBS Radio. He did "all voices and narration" in the 15-minute dramatic anthology. He also recorded 260 episodes of a program described in a 1950 trade publication as "Marvin Miller: Famous radio voice in series of five minute vignettes about famous people." The program was syndicated via electrical transcription by The Cardinal Company.

He also won Grammy Awards in 1965 and 1966 for his recordings of Dr. Seuss stories: in 1967 for Dr Seuss Presents – If I Ran the Zoo and Sleep Book and 1966 for Dr Seuss Presents Fox in Socks and Green Eggs and Ham. He also read Horton Hatches the Egg, The Sneetches and Other Stories and Yertle the Turtle and Other Stories.,

In the mid-1970s, Miller even lent his voice to sports films, narrating the official Indianapolis 500 films in 1975 and 1976.

Films
In films, the heavyset Miller was often cast as a villain, many times playing Asian roles. He portrayed a sadistic henchman in the 1947 Humphrey Bogart film Dead Reckoning and was Yamada in the 1945 James Cagney effort Blood on the Sun. In 1946's film noir Deadline at Dawn he plays Sleepy Parsons, a blind pianist. Miller played George "Gusty" Gustafson in the George Raft film noir classic Johnny Angel.

Miller also did a great deal of voice work in animation from the 1950s to 1970s, from the narration on the 1950 Academy Award-winning United Productions of America cartoon Gerald McBoing Boing to the 1970  The Ant and the Aardvark cartoon Scratch a Tiger.

Television
From 1949 to 1950 he starred as Dr. Yat Fu on the short-lived ABC series Mysteries of Chinatown, with Gloria Saunders cast as his niece. In 1961, Miller guest-starred as Johnny Kelso, with Erin O'Brien, in "The Marble Slab" episode of the Frederick Ziv-, United Artists-, and MGM-produced Bat Masterson, starring Gene Barry. Original air date was May 11, 1961.

Miller voiced "Mr. Sun" in the AT&T educational film Our Mr. Sun, and "Hemo" in the AT&T educational film Hemo the Magnificent, parts of a series featuring Dr. Frank C. Baxter and directed by Frank Capra, which was shown on American network television in 1956 and 1957. Miller crossed paths with other prolific voice-over artists many times in his career, including June Foray, playing "Deer" in Hemo the Magnificent and in the TV series Rocky and Bullwinkle along with Paul Frees, who voiced "Boris Badenov" in that program. Miller and Frees also performed in separate segments on the audio recording Stan Freberg Presents The United States of America Volume One The Early Years.

Miller made a guest appearance in 1963 on Perry Mason as unscrupulous attorney F.J. Weatherby in "The Case of the Lover's Leap".

Miller voiced Aquaman for the Filmation studio for their 1967 series The Superman/Aquaman Hour of Adventure.  He was also the voice of pilot/scientist Busby Birdwell in the company's animated series Fantastic Voyage.

He was the voice of the arrogant alien "Zarn" in three episodes of the second season of Land of the Lost. Miller also lent his distinct voice to The Pink Panther Show, often talking with the feline offscreen and asking questions, while also voicing The Inspector, his second Deux Deux and their boss The Commissioner.

On The Millionaire, Miller played Michael Anthony in more than 200 episodes, conveying the wishes of the "fabulously wealthy" John Beresford Tipton, Jr., voiced by Paul Frees.

Death
Miller died in 1985 at the age of 71 from a heart attack. He is entombed at Pierce Brothers Westwood Village Memorial Park and Mortuary in Los Angeles.

For his contribution to the television industry, Marvin Miller has a star on the Hollywood Walk of Fame at 6101 Hollywood Boulevard.

Filmography

References

External links

1913 births
1985 deaths
American male film actors
American male television actors
American male voice actors
American male radio actors
Audiobook narrators
Burials at Westwood Village Memorial Park Cemetery
Grammy Award winners
Male actors from St. Louis
Radio and television announcers
Washington University in St. Louis alumni
20th-century American male actors